Sun International Hotels Limited is a resort hotel chain and casino destination from South Africa created by Sol Kerzner, best known for its Sun City Resort near Rustenburg in the North West Province. Specialising in gaming, hospitality and entertainment, the company owns 42.5% of the South African casino market. Sun International Hotels is headquartered in the Bahamas, on Paradise Island, which is the world's largest island resort, 70% of which is owned by the company. Sun International was incorporated in South Africa in 1967 and also runs a head office in Sandton, Johannesburg.

History 
Their hotel business traces its roots back to 1969, when the Southern Sun Hotel Company was created when South African Breweries and South African businessman Sol Kerzner joined forces. By 1983, Southern Sun Hotels was operating 35 hotels, and generating a net income of $35 million. At this time, South African Breweries split its hotel interests into two; Sun International, headed by Sol Kerzner, retained all of the casino hotels located in the areas that South Africa had designated as "independent homelands" and had Southern Sun as a 20% stakeholder. Sol Kerzner sold all of his share in Southern Sun to focus on Sun International (South Africa). Southern Sun retained the company's other hotels in South Africa, and remained focused on the hotel market rather than casinos. 1984 saw the commencement of Kersaf Investments Limited, a company that took great interest in Sun International (South Africa). This commencement was by a scheme of arrangement, such that Sun International would form one of Kersaf's subsidiaries. Kersaf was more focused on cinemas, restaurants, shopping and leisure at first, but as the next twenty years passed, its hotel and casino interests thrived under the Sun International brand, and slowly Kersaf began to dispose of its other interests and acquire more share in Sun International.

After the end of Apartheid in South Africa in 1994, the so-called homelands were re-integrated into the new South Africa. This allowed Southern Sun to develop its own gaming resorts and began to compete increasingly with Sun International. In 2000, Southern Sun sold its stake in Sun International to Kersaf Investments Limited, who then continued to acquire minority interests in Sun International. In 2004, Kersaf Investments Limited merged with Sun International to form Sun International Limited, the company that exists today. In early 2015, Sun International sold its hotels in Botswana, Lesotho, Namibia and Zambia to Minor International. Since mid-2015, these have been run as hotels of the Avani Group. As of 2017, Sun International Limited owns or is involved in 19 international hotels, casinos and resorts.

Properties 

Today, Sun International's operations include integrated resorts, luxury hotel products, limited payout machine slot routes, as well as casinos.

The Sun City Resort annually hosts the Miss South Africa pageant and the Nedbank Golf Challenge.

References

Companies established in 1967
1967 establishments in South Africa
Companies based in Sandton
Gambling companies of South Africa
Hospitality companies of South Africa
Hotels in South Africa
InterContinental Hotels Group brands
Casinos in South Africa
Companies listed on the Johannesburg Stock Exchange